Yellow Quill 90-11 is an Indian reserve of the Yellow Quill First Nation in Saskatchewan.

References

Indian reserves in Saskatchewan